Corethrogyne is a genus of flowering plants in the family Asteraceae.

Overview 
Corethrogyne is native to California, Oregon, and Baja California. It is highly variable, which has resulted in over 60 specific and varietal names having been proposed within the genus. Some sources combine all the plants in the genus into one species (C. filaginifolia) while others recognize two.
 Corethrogyne californica Greene 1836 not DC. 1836 
 Corethrogyne filaginifolia (Hook. & Arn.) Nutt.	- common sandaster, California aster

References

Flora of North America
Astereae
Asteraceae genera